Francesco Foggia (baptized 17 November 1603 – 8 January 1688) was an Italian Baroque composer.

Biography
Foggia was a boy soprano at the Collegium Germanicum of the Jesuits in Rome, and was a student of Antonio Cifra, and Paolo Agostini. Perhaps his family was in contact with Giovanni Bernardino Nanino, maestro di capella at San Luigi dei Francesi. Later, he was probably employed at the court of the Bavarian Elector Maximilian I in Munich and then again in Vienna.

He served in various churches in Rome as maestro di capella and infrequently as an organist. From October 1634 he served for two years at the chapel of St. Mary in Trastevere; from December 1646 to 1661 he was Kapellmeister of the Patriarchal Basilica of St. John Lateran. In 1667, while music director of the Basilica of San Lorenzo in Damaso, he published a collection, Psalmodia Vespertina, containing psalms, Magnificats, and Marian antiphons. From 1677 until his death, he was chapel master at the papal basilica of Santa Maria Maggiore in Rome, and while there published his valedictory Offertoria (1681). That publication has been linked to Palestrina's of about a century before. His son Antonio succeeded him in the same position at Santa Maria Maggiore. His wife Eugenia died on 12 March 1683; Foggia died on 8 January 1688 and was buried in the church of Santa Prassede in Rome.

Works (selection)
Foggia's works were known outside the areas he worked - Italy, Munich and Vienna. For example, while he never worked in France, 7 of Foggia's motets survive in a collection by Danican Philidor, along with motets by Carissimi, Daniel Danielis, Pierre Robert and Lully. 
Beatus ille servus, 4-part motet for men's chorus and basso continuo, Braun-Peretti Bonn 1984
Beatus vir qui timet dominum, Manuscript in the papers of Gustav Düben, edited by C. Hofius Ammerbuch, 2007
Celebrate o fideles (1646), Manuscript in the papers of Gustav Düben
Cessate, deh, Cessate for soprano and basso continuo, Cantio Sacra, vol. 38, ed. Rudolf Ewerhart, Verlag Edmund Bieler Köln 1976
Confitebor tibi domine, Manuscript in the papers of Gustav Düben, edited by C. Hofius Ammerbuch, 2007
David fugiens a facie Saul, oratorio
De valle lacrimarum for soloists and basso continuo, Cantio Sacra, vol. 28, ed. Rudolf Ewerhart, Verlag Edmund Bieler Köln 
Dixit Dominus Domino meo, C. Hofius Ammerbuch, 2007
Domine quinque talenta, Manuscript in the papers of Gustav Düben
Egredimini addicte Christi nomini, Manuscript in the papers of Gustav Düben
Eccelsi lumini cultures, Manuscript in the papers of Gustav Düben
Exultantes et laetantes, Manuscript in the papers of Gustav Düben
Gaudete jubilate o gentes, C. Hofius Ammerbuch, 2007
Hodie apparuerunt voluptates, Manuscript in the papers of Gustav Düben
Laetamini cum Jerusalem, Manuscript in the papers of Gustav Düben
Laeta nobis refulget dies, Manuscript in the papers of Gustav Düben
Laetantes canite diem laetitia, Manuscript in the papers of Gustav Düben, edited by C. Hofius Ammerbuch, 2008
Laetatus sum in his, Manuscript in the papers of Gustav Düben
Laudate Dominum omnes gentes, Manuscript in the papers of Gustav Düben, edited by C. Hofius Ammerbuch, 2007
Laudate Pueri Dominum, C. Hofius Ammerbuch, 2007
Magnificat for 5 voices and basso continuo
Magnificat concertata con instromenti di 6 tono for 9-voice choir and instruments, C. Hofius Ammerbuch, 2007
Quare suspiras in dolore anima mea
Serve bone et fidelis
Tobiae oratorium, oratorio
Victoria Passionis Christi, oratorio

Further reading

Carl Fassbender: Francesco Foggia (1604-1688): Untersuchungen zu seinem Leben und zu seinem Motettenschaffen, dissertation. Bonn, 1980
Gunther Morche: Francesco Foggia: Sein Beitrag zur konzertierenden Motette, in: Musica e musicisti nel Lazio, Fondazione Giovanni Pierluigi da Palestrina, Palestrina 1998

External links

 

Italian Baroque composers
Italian Baroque
1603 births
1688 deaths
Italian male classical composers
Place of birth missing
Place of death missing
17th-century Italian composers
17th-century male musicians